Ison and Fille more commonly Ison & Fille is a Swedish hip hop duo consisting of Ison Glasgow ("Ison") and Felipe Leiva Wenger ("Fille").

The two met in 1994 in JKS basketball club in Bredäng, Sweden. Their initial songs were included in a 2000 compilation album Den svenska underjorden (meaning the Swedish underground). 
Media attention on the duo came with ZTV, a Swedish television channel putting out Ison & Fille 2006 release "När vi glider".

The duo have cooperated with various artists like Swedish rapper Petter, Dekan Ahmed and the rap crew Highwon.

Members
Ison Glasgow ("Ison"), born October 8, 1980, is a US-born rapper, but grew up in Bredäng. He immigrated to Sweden in 1986. His father died when he was just 13.
Felipe Leiva Wenger ("Fille), born April 25, 1980, comes from Chile and grew up in Vårberg. He immigrated to Sweden in 1985 with his parents and two other siblings. Soon after the father left to Barbados where he died.

In popular culture
The duo also took part in the Swedish TV series Leende guldbruna ögon broadcast on Sveriges Television (SVT) where they played the roles of Carlos and Mike. This was followed by appearances in another television series, Lilla Al-Fadji & Co broadcast on Kanal 5 and in comedy series Sverige dansar och ler. Ison and Fille has toured Sweden extensively since the early 2000s. Ison served as one of four judges in the inaugural season of the Swedish The X Factor in 2012, broadcast on TV4. He coached the "Boys" category. Ison & Fille subsequently took part in the Music Aid 2013 event with their songs "Vår sida av stan" and "Galen". In 2015, the duo participated in season six of the Swedish TV-serie Så mycket bättre, broadcast on TV4.

Grillat & Grändy
Fille and Sabo also run the hip hop musical project Grillat & Grändy with occasional collaborations with Ison as well. In 2015, Grillat & Grändy released the album Kör vi tills att dör vi. The album charted on Sverigetopplistan, the official Swedish albums chart.

Awards
In 2012, Ison & Fille won the P3 Gold Award in the category "Best Hip Hop / Soul Act of the Year".

Discography

Albums

EPs
2001: Tillbaka till gatan
2007: Vad e det för Mode?

Singles

Other releases
2001: "När vi glider" (with Sabo & Ju-mazz)
2002: "Fakka ur"
2004: "Ta d dit"
2004: "Vill va Highwon" (with Hoosam, Sabo & Gurmo)
2004: "Haffa"
2006: "Ge mig" (with Sabo & Gurmo)
2006: "Lägg ner ditt vapen" (with Ismail Skalli El Hachimi)
2006: "Hela dan varje dag" (with Sabo)
2007: "Vad e det för mode"
2009: "Jag skrattar idag"
2009: "Ikväll är vi kungar"
2009: "För alla dom" (with Petter & Mogge)
2010: "Från hjärtat" (with Highwon)
2010: "Stationen" (with Stor & Aleks)
2011: "Galen"
2011: "Sena nätter, tomma glas" (with Veronica Maggio)
2013: "Vår sida av stan"

Collaborations

Notes

References

External links

Swedish rappers
American emigrants to Sweden
Swedish hip hop groups
Swedish musical duos
1994 establishments in Sweden
Musical groups established in 1994
Chilean emigrants to Sweden